Hugin may refer to:
 Bob Hugin (born 1954/1955), American politician and businessman
 Hugin (longship), a Danish reconstruction of a Viking longship on display in Ramsgate, England
 HUGIN, a widely used tool for uncertain reasoning using Bayesian networks
 Hugin (software), an image editing program that creates panoramas and high dynamic range imaging (HDR) images from multiple images, open source, cross platform
 Hugin, an autonomous underwater vehicle developed by Kongsberg Maritime and the Norwegian Defence Research Establishment (FFI)
 Hugin-class destroyer, a Royal Swedish Navy class of destroyers

See also
 Huginn and Muninn, a pair of ravens in Norse Mythology